Jacob Best Sr. (1786 – 1861) was a German-American brewer who founded what would later become known as the Pabst Brewing Company in Milwaukee, Wisconsin.

Life and career
Best was born in Hesse-Darmstadt, where he learned the trade and ran a small brewery in Mettenheim, Rhenish Hesse, until immigrating to Milwaukee in 1844 to join his sons.

In Milwaukee, Jacob Best founded Empire Brewery on Chestnut Street Hill, which he ran with his sons, Phillip, Jacob Jr., Charles, and Lorenz. Charles and Lorenz soon withdrew from the company, with Charles establishing the Plank Road Brewery (now the Miller Brewing Company). His daughter Margaretha married Moritz Schoeffler, a prominent newspaper editor who founded The Wisconsin Banner. Empire Brewery produced 300 barrels in its first year. The name was changed to Best and Company and became one of the most successful breweries in Milwaukee.

After Jacob Sr. retired in 1853, Phillip and Jacob Jr. continued operations as a partnership.  The Best brewery was renamed Phillip Best Brewery.   Phillip's sons-in-law, Emil Schandein and Captain Frederick Pabst, later bought the brewery from Phillip. When Phillip died, his wife Lisette Best became vice president. By 1874, Phillip Best Brewing Co. was the nation's largest brewer, supplying Chicago after the Great Chicago Fire.  The brewery was renamed Pabst Brewing Company and remained at the same location along Chestnut Street (now Juneau Avenue) until closure of the complex in 1997.

Jacob Best Sr. devoted the remainder of his life to local politics. He is buried at Forest Home Cemetery in Milwaukee.

See also
 Eberhard Anheuser
 Valentin Blatz
 Adolphus Busch
 Adolph Coors
 Gottlieb Heileman
 Frederick Miller
 Frederick Pabst
 Joseph Schlitz
 August Uihlein

References

External links
Dictionary of Wisconsin History 
American Breweriana Journal

1786 births
1861 deaths
German emigrants to the United States
American brewers
Businesspeople from Milwaukee
People from the Landgraviate of Hesse-Darmstadt
19th-century American businesspeople